Brayton is both a surname and a given name. Notable people with the name include:

Surname:
 Ada Margaret Brayton (fl. 1920s–1930s), American astronomer
 Charles R. Brayton (1840–1910), American Republican politician
 Charles Brayton (judge) (1772–1834), justice of the Rhode Island Supreme Court
 Chuck Brayton (1925–2015), American baseball head coach for the Washington State Cougars
 George Brayton (1830–1892), American mechanical engineer
 George Brayton (New York politician) (1772–1837), New York politician
 George A. Brayton (1803–1880), associate justice of the Rhode Island Supreme Court
 Lee Brayton (1933–2022), American racing driver
 Lily Brayton (1876–1953), English actress
 Scott Brayton (1959–1996), American race car driver
 Tyler Brayton (born 1979), American football for the Carolina Panthers
 William Brayton (Vermont judge) (1787–1828), justice of the Vermont Supreme Court
 William Daniel Brayton (1815–1887), U.S. Representative from Rhode Island

Given name:
 Brayton Biekman (born 1978), Dutch footballer
 Brayton Bowman (fl. 2010s–2020s) American singer-songwriter
 Brayton Ives (1840–1914), president of Northern Pacific Railway, of the New York Stock Exchange and of the Western National Bank of New York
 Brayton Knapp (born 1986), American professional soccer player
 Brayton Laster (born 2002), American professional stock car racing driver
 Brayton H. Ransom (1879–1925), American zoologist and veterinary parasitologist
 Brayton Vázquez (born 1998), Mexican professional footballer

English-language surnames